Willem Boshoff is a South African rugby league former rugby league footballer who represented South Africa at the 1995 World Cup, playing in all three matches in which they were involved.

References

Living people
South African rugby league players
South Africa national rugby league team players
Rugby league centres
Place of birth missing (living people)
Year of birth missing (living people)